Crambus virgatellus is a moth in the family Crambidae. It was described by Alfred Ernest Wileman in 1911. It is found in Japan, Korea and China (Zhejiang).

References

Crambini
Moths described in 1911
Moths of Asia